A Fal (Hungarian for The Wall) is a game show broadcast on Hungarian television station RTL Klub. It is affiliated with the U.S. game show The Wall.

The eponymous wall is a five-story-tall pegboard, similar to a pachinko game or bean machine; it also is similar to the Plinko board used for that pricing game of the same name on The Price Is Right. The bottom of the board is divided into 15 slots marked with various Hungarian forint amounts, some of which increase as the game progresses. Seven numbered "drop zones" are centered at the top of the board (above the center seven slots), from which balls can be dropped into play.

A team of two contestants plays each game, with a potential top prize of 100,000,000 Ft. Green balls dropped on the board will add to the team's bank, while red balls dropped on the board will subtract from it. Throughout the game, the bank has a floor of 0 Ft.

 The contestants won more than 8 million Ft
 The contestants left with the larger possible amount
 The contestants left with the smaller possible amount
 The contestants left with nothing at all.

R*: The first and second broadcast recorded in Milan.

Seasons

Hungarian game shows
2010s Hungarian television series
2017 Hungarian television series debuts
2018 Hungarian television series endings
Non-American television series based on American television series
RTL (Hungarian TV channel) original programming